The Victoria Radio Network (VRN) is a hospital radio station based in Kirkcaldy, Scotland. It currently broadcasts 24 hours a day to the premises of the Victoria Hospital and surrounding facilities  to patients' bedside radios and www.vrnkirkcaldy.com

History
VRN was formed in February 1971 by a group of young people in Kirkcaldy. Its first broadcast took place on 3 March, and the studio was originally housed in a cupboard of the main tower block of the hospital.

The station moved to premises on nearby St Clair Street, approximately 1 mile from the hospital. However, when this area was later redeveloped, the station moved back to the hospital site. This time, a custom-built studio was created out of Portakabins. The final move was to an old boiler house on Willow Drive.

In 2002, VRN was awarded a medium wave broadcasting licence. The first AM (medium wave) broadcast took place on 2 February 2002, and the station continued to broadcast on AM till Dec 2017. The station is now available on bed side tablets and on line at www.vrnkirkcaldy.com.

0

Membership
VRN is run entirely by volunteers, with no full-time members of staff. There are currently around 50 members of the team. The majority of members are presenters, but there are also ward visitors, fundraisers and committee positions.

Broadcasting Output
As a hospital station, output is directed towards patients, staff and visitors.
Main programming features include:

 Patient Request Shows every weeknight
 Live commentaries of Raith Rovers Saturday home matches.
 VRN's Book at Bedtime - a selection of audio books
 Getting to Know You - local people are interviewed, and select music to play

When presenters are not in the studio, a series of pre-recorded programmes are played along with music.

Former members
An important function of hospital radio is that it has allows a first step for those looking to work in broadcasting.

Notable former members of VRN include:
 Richard Park - Managing Director of Global Radio
 Arthur Ballingall - (former) Managing Director of Radio Tay
 Jackie Storrar - Country and Western singer and broadcaster
 Scott Davie - BBC Scotland Football Commentator
 Laura Haldane - Scottish News Anchor for ITV's Daybreak

Awards
VRN has received awards, many of which have come from the Hospital Broadcasting Association (HBA).
Recent awards include:

2006
 Male Presenter of the Year (HBA): John Murray - bronze award
 Female Presenter of the Year (HBA): Laura Haldane - silver award

2007
 Male Presenter of the Year (HBA): John Murray - gold award
 Best Speech Package (HBA): Interview with Gordon Brown - silver award
 Best Specialised Music (HBA): Blues & Stuff - bronze award
 Station of the Year (HBA) - silver award

2008
 Best Radio Broadcast (Creative Fife): The Treatment Table
 Male Presenter of the Year (HBA): Neil Ingebrigtsen - bronze award

2010
 The John Whitney Award(HBA): John Murray

Website
As a hospital station, VRN streams its output online. A selection of archived material can be listened to.

References

External links
 

Hospital radio stations
Kirkcaldy
Radio stations established in 1971
Radio stations in Scotland